The Burnett Highway is an inland rural highway located in Queensland, Australia. The highway runs between its junction with the Bruce Highway at Gracemere, just south of Rockhampton, and Nanango. Its length is approximately 542 kilometres. The highway takes its name from the Burnett River, which it crosses in Gayndah. It is designated as a State Strategic Road (part of Australia’s Country Way) by the Queensland Government.

History
In January 2013, Cyclone Oswald caused flood damage to the road and a partial closure between Bouldercombe and Mount Morgan, which took longer than a year to repair.

Roads of Strategic Importance upgrade
The Roads of Strategic Importance initiative, last updated in March 2022, includes the following project for the Burnett Highway.

Intersection upgrade
A project to upgrade the intersection of the Burnett Highway with Gayndah-Mount Perry Road and Wetherton Road, at an estimated cost of $875,000, is expected to complete in late 2022.

Other upgrades

Replace bridges
A project to replace the bridge over Three Moon Creek, at a cost of $18 million, was completed in August 2021.

A project to replace the bridge over North Kariboe Creek, at a cost of $7.2 million, was completed in September 2021.

Strengthen and widen bridge
A project to strengthen and widen the bridge over Callide Creek, at a cost of $3.9 million, was due for completion in early 2022.

List of towns on the Burnett Highway
From north to south
 Bouldercombe
 Mount Morgan
 Dululu
 Jambin
 Biloela
 Thangool
 Monto
 Eidsvold
 Mundubbera
 Gayndah
 Ban Ban Springs
 Goomeri
 Nanango

Gallery

Major intersections

See also

 Highways in Australia
 List of highways in Queensland
 List of road routes in Queensland

References

Highways in Queensland
Wide Bay–Burnett
Central Queensland